Jaan Soots ( – 6 February 1942) was an Estonian military commander during the Estonian War of Independence and politician.

Jaan Soots was born in Küti farmstead, Linna village, Helme Parish, Viljandi County (now in Tõrva Parish, Valga County), Governorate of Livonia, Russian Empire. He joined the army voluntarily in 1900, studied between 1901 and 1904 at Vilnius Military Academy, participated in the Russo-Japanese War and from 1910 to 1913 studied at the Imperial Nicholas Military Academy. At the beginning of the Estonian War of Independence, Soots was Chief of Operative Staff; in February 1919 he became Chief of Staff of the Commander-in-Chief. In 1919, Soots also achieved the rank of Major General. Soots also participated in the Tartu peace conference and retired in 1920. Later, he was twice a Minister of War, member of the State Assembly, Mayor and Lord Mayor (ülemlinnapea) of Tallinn. In 1938, he received Herbert Hoover, who, as an honorary citizen of Tallinn, visited Estonia. In 1940, Soviet occupation authorities arrested Soots and in 1942 he died in Ussollag prison camp in Usolye, Perm Oblast.

Soots is recipient of the Estonian Order of the White Star, 1st class, and the Latvian military Order of Lāčplēsis, 2nd class.

See also 
Estonian War of Independence
Freikorps in the Baltic

References

 Jaan Soots
 Ülo Kaevats et al. 2000. Eesti Entsüklopeedia 14. Tallinn: Eesti Entsüklopeediakirjastus,

External links

1880 births
1942 deaths
People from Tõrva Parish
People from Kreis Fellin
Farmers' Assemblies politicians
Defence Ministers of Estonia
Members of the Riigikogu, 1920–1923
Members of the Riigikogu, 1923–1926
Members of the Riigikogu, 1926–1929
Members of the Riigikogu, 1929–1932
Members of the Riigikogu, 1932–1934
Members of the Estonian National Assembly
Members of the Riiginõukogu
Mayors of Tallinn
Estonian major generals
Imperial Russian Army officers
Russian military personnel of the Russo-Japanese War
Russian military personnel of World War I
Estonian military personnel of the Estonian War of Independence
Recipients of the Order of St. Vladimir, 4th class
Recipients of the Order of Saint Stanislaus (Russian), 2nd class
Recipients of the Cross of Liberty (Estonia)
Recipients of the Order of Lāčplēsis, 2nd class
Recipients of the Order of the Three Stars
Estonian people who died in prison custody
People who died in the Gulag
Estonian people who died in Soviet detention